Sarkis "Sark" Arslanian (February 4, 1924 – December 11, 2016) was an American football coach.  He served as the head football coach at Weber State University from 1965 to 1972 and at Colorado State University from 1973 to 1981,  compiling a career college football record of 95–73–6.

Biography
Beginning in 1955, Arslanian spent ten seasons as the football coach at Dixie Junior College. In 1965, he assumed the same position at Weber State University, where he coached until 1972 and was the winningest coach in school history. The next year, he became the head coach at Colorado State University. The 1977 Colorado State team was one of the most successful in school history, finishing 9–2–1 and receiving votes in the Associated Press Top 25 poll. He stayed at Colorado State until 1981.

After a long and successful career as a football coach at the collegiate and professional levels, he helped establish a winning tradition at Pine View High School in St. George, Utah.  After a bypass surgery, he resigned as head coach of Pine View and began coaching eighth graders at Pine View Middle School.  As of 2007, Arslanian was the oldest active football coach in the United States. An Armenian-American, Arslanian once traveled to Armenia to establish an American Football League in his home country. He served the United States Army during World War II.

Arslanian is the father of Dave Arslanian who later coached at Weber State from 1989 to 1997, assisted by his brother Paul Arslanian. On September 14, 2013, the field at Hansen Stadium on the campus of Dixie State University was named Sark Arslanian Field. He died on December 11, 2016, at the age of 92.

Head coaching record

College

References

1924 births
2016 deaths
Colorado State Rams football coaches
Weber State Wildcats football coaches
Utah Tech Trailblazers football coaches
University of Utah alumni
Utah State University alumni
Sportspeople from Fresno, California
American people of Armenian descent